Xylophanes acrus is a moth of the  family Sphingidae. It is known to be present in Panama, Costa Rica and Honduras.

The wingspan is 72–83 mm, with females being larger than males. It is similar to Xylophanes cyrene but more green.

Adults are on wing year-round in Costa Rica. In Honduras, adults have been recorded in May.

Larvae have been recorded feeding on Psychotria chiriquina, Psychotria monteverdensis, Psychotria panamensis, Psychotria nervosa and Pavonia guanacastensis.

References

acrus
Moths described in 1910